Gauri Shinde (born 6 July 1974) is an Indian film director and screenwriter. Shinde made her directional debut with the highly acclaimed English Vinglish (2012), which marked the comeback of actress Sridevi. Shinde featured in the Financial Times 2012 list of '25 Indians To Watch'. She also featured on Rediff's list of 'Bollywood's 5 Best Directors of 2012'.

Early life and education
Gauri Shinde was born and brought up in Pune, where she studied at St Joseph's High School and later graduated from Symbiosis Institute of Mass Communication in Pune. Her aspiration towards film-making started right from the days at the end of her college life.

Career
She moved to Mumbai for her internship with documentary director Siddharth Kak and later started working with advertising agencies like IBW, Bates Clarion and Lowe Lintas, where R. Balki was the creative director.
 In following years she made over 100 advertising films and short films; her short film Oh Man! (2001) was selected for the Berlin Film Festival.

She made her feature film debut as a director with English Vinglish (2012), a film inspired by Shinde's own relationship with her mother, who ran her own pickle business out of her home in Pune, and was a Marathi-speaking woman, who didn't speak English well, which embarrassed Shinde as a child. As she said in an interview, "I made this film to say sorry to my mother." The film was released on 14 September 2012 at the Toronto International Film Festival followed by its commercial release in India and worldwide on 5 October 2012, and went on to receive both critical and commercial success. Besides the Filmfare Award for Best Debut Director, she was awarded the 'Laadli National Media Awards for Gender Sensitivity'.

Personal life
Shinde married film director R. Balki in 2007.

Filmography

Awards

References

External links

 

1974 births
Living people
Artists from Pune
Indian women film directors
Indian advertising directors
Indian women screenwriters
Hindi-language film directors
Filmfare Awards winners
20th-century Indian film directors
21st-century Indian film directors
21st-century Indian women artists
Women artists from Maharashtra
Hindi screenwriters
Screenwriters from Maharashtra
20th-century Indian women